Begeč is a suburban settlement of the city of Novi Sad in Serbia. According to the 2011 census, the village had a Serb ethnic majority and its population was 3,325.

Geography

History
Begeč was first mentioned in the 16th century and its name is derived from the Ottoman ruling title "beg" (or "bey") and word "eč" (meaning "village"), hence the full meaning of the name would be "the village of the beg". In Hungarian, the name was spelt Begecs. There is a Serbian Orthodox church dating to 1838 in the village.

Archaeology
The archeological site of Castellum Onagrinum is located on the left shore of the Danube. It includes ruins of a Roman fortress built in the late 3rd century. The site is part of the Cultural Heritage of Serbia list, inscribed in 1995.

Demographics

Transport
 
Begeč is connected to Novi Sad by the public bus line 56, which operates daily and connect Begeč with Futog, Veternik and Novi Sad. Begeč is also on the bus route from Bač and Bačka Palanka to Novi Sad.

Begeč is also connected by a river ferry to the village of Banoštor in Syrmia, across the Danube river. For pedestrians and bicyclists it is free of charge, while cars pay a toll of 200 Serbian dinars (approximately 2 euros).

Notable people
 Vujadin Boškov, footballer
 Milan Pavkov, footballer

See also
 List of places in Serbia
 List of cities, towns and villages in Vojvodina

References

 Slobodan Ćurčić, Broj stanovnika Vojvodine, Novi Sad, 1996.

Suburbs of Novi Sad
Places in Bačka
South Bačka District